The 1971 World Table Tennis Championships women's singles was the 31st edition of the women's singles championship.
Lin Hui-ching defeated Cheng Min-chih in the final by three sets to one, to win the title.

Results

See also
List of World Table Tennis Championships medalists

References

-
1971 in women's table tennis